Formal diplomatic relations between Angola and Spain were established in 1977. Angola has an embassy in Madrid. Spain has an embassy in Luanda.

Diplomatic relations 
Spain and Angola established diplomatic relations on 19 October 1977. The agreement was signed at the headquarters of the United Nations in New York City between the Ambassador of Spain, Jaime de Piniés, and his Angolan counterpart, Elisio de Figueiredo. The 20 May 1987 was signed in Luanda by the General Cooperation Agreement between Luis Yáñez Barnuevo, Secretary of State for Cooperation and for Latin America, and Pedro de Castro Van-Dúnem, Minister of State for the productive sphere. The agreement provided for the holding of a Joint Cooperation Commission.

Proof of the good understanding between both governments was the resolution of the debt problem. In April 2006 the debt that Angola accumulated
with Spain it was 1,191 million dollars, which placed Spain as second creditor of Angola after France. In December 2006, within the framework of the Paris Club, Angola made the principal of the debt effective (US$732 million). This payment was completed with the negotiation of default interest (US$276 million) concluded at the end of 2007.

Angolan President João Lourenço visited Spain in September 2021, meeting with King Felipe VI and Prime Minister Pedro Sánchez. Lourenço and Sánchez signed a joint declaration vowing to deepen the bilateral relations and favour Spanish investment in Angola.

Economic relations 

The trade balance between Spain and Angola presents, since 2004, a trade deficit for Spain due to crude purchases. In 2014 there has been a large increase in these, which has caused Spain's trade deficit to increase. Angola is in 2013 in position 61 as a customer and in 25 as a supplier. In 2012 he was in position 64 as a customer and in 43 as a supplier and in 2011 in 63 as a customer and 64 as a supplier.

The impact of the purchase of crude oil by Spain is clear. 99% of Spanish imports are concentrated in oil. On the other hand, Spanish exports to Angola are very diversified: food, beverages and consumer goods account for 25%, while 75% remaining are fuels, equipment goods and industrial products. Angola is an important market for Spain within Sub-Saharan Africa.

Angola was the third client in Spain in 2014 after South Africa and Nigeria and the second supplier after Nigeria.

Cooperation 
The Spanish Cooperation began its activities in Angola in 1983, with the signing of the Basic Agreement of Scientific and Technical Cooperation and has definitively closed the OTC on 30 June 2015. Since then, and for more than 30 years, the governments of Angola and Spain have signed several Agreements to establish the priority sectors for collaboration and intervention. Every three or four years a Commission has been Mixed composed of officials and experts in cooperation of both countries to define the strategic lines of action and monitor and evaluate the execution and the results achieved in the different joint projects. The VI Mixed Commission 2005 – 2008 has been extended, having negotiated since 2009 the terms of a Country Partnership Framework (MAP) for the period 2011 – 2015. Both documents, de facto in force to date, have been fully aligned with the National Development Plans and the III AECID Master Plan 2009 – 2012.

See also
 Foreign relations of Angola
 Foreign relations of Spain

References

 
Spain
Angola